Macquarie Park Cemetery and Crematorium formerly Northern Suburbs General Cemetery is a cemetery and crematorium in the Northern Suburbs of Sydney, Australia. The park caters for all religious, ethnic and cultural requirements.

History 
Macquarie Park is owned by the Government of New South Wales, administered by the NSW Department of Primary Industries through a Board of Trustees currently chaired by Dr John Hewson. The cemetery and crematorium are managed by Northern Cemeteries, a not for profit organisation on Crown Land.

The Board of Trustees were notably the plaintiffs in the landmark Northern Suburbs General Cemetery Reserve Trust v Commonwealth High Court of Australia case in 1993. 

With the introduction of the chapels and crematorium, the name of the park was changed in 2004 from Northern Suburbs General Cemetery to its current name.

List of internees
Macquarie Park and Crematorium caters for both burials and the interment of ashes. The most notable interments are Sir John Kerr, Governor General of Australia whom dismissed the Whitlam Government causing the 1975 Australian constitutional crisis; two former Prime Ministers of Australia, Billy Hughes and Bob Hawke as well as entertainers Johnny O'Keefe and Don Lane.

 Dame Heather Begg, opera singer   
 Albert Bruntnell, politician
 Kathleen M. Butler, Godmother of Sydney Harbour Bridge.
 Rob Guest, actor  
 Bob Hawke, 23rd Prime Minister of Australia 
 Billy Hughes, 7th Prime Minister of Australia 
 Dame Mary Hughes, spouse of Billy Hughes 
 Lawrence Alexander Sidney Johnson, botanist
 Sir John Kerr, 18th Governor General of Australia and 13th Chief Justice of New South Wales  
 Anne Kerr, Lady Kerr, wife of Sir John Kerr 
 Don Lane, entertainer  
 Raymond Longford, actor and director 
 Lottie Lyell, actress 
 Ricky May, entertainer 
 AM Sir John McCauley, Chief of the Australian Air Force
 Johnny O'Keefe, entertainer    
 Jack Renshaw 31st Premier of New South Wales
William Sandford, pioneer of the iron and steel industry
 Donald Shanks, opera singer 
 Eric Spooner, politician 
 Ethel Turner, writer
 Sir Cyril Walsh, Justice of the High Court of Australia   
 Francis Webb, poet
 Maj. Gen. Sir George Wootten, soldier
 Liang Yusheng (Chen Wentong), writer

Gallery

References

1922 establishments in Australia
Anglican cemeteries in Australia
Cemeteries in Sydney
Eastern Orthodox cemeteries
Roman Catholic cemeteries in Australia